The year 524 BC was a year of the pre-Julian Roman calendar. In the Roman Empire, it was known as year 230  Ab urbe condita. The denomination 524 BC for this year has been used since the early medieval period, when the Anno Domini calendar era became the prevalent method in Europe for naming years.

Events

By place

Southern Italy 
Battle of Cumae - An army of Umbrians, Daunians, Etruscans, and others is defeated by the Greeks of Cumae, present-day Italy.

Births 
 Themistocles, archon of Athens (approximate date) (d. 459 BC)

Deaths

References